Wingello railway station is a heritage-listed railway station on the Main South line in New South Wales, Australia. It serves the village of Wingello. It was added to the New South Wales State Heritage Register on 2 April 1999.

History

It opened on 1 June 1871 as a siding, with a station built in 1882.

Platforms & services
Wingello has two side platforms. It is serviced by early morning and evening NSW TrainLink Southern Highlands Line services travelling between Sydney Central, Campbelltown, Moss Vale and Goulburn.

During the day, it is served by one NSW TrainLink road coach service in each direction between Moss Vale and Goulburn.

Description 

The station complex includes two timber station buildings: a third-class building of type 4 design (1871) and a timber island/side building (1915) with shelter shed and a brick-faced platform (1915). A reverse skillion-roofed timber signal box (1915) and skillion roofed out of shed also form part of the precinct. The station plantings, lights and furniture are also included in the heritage listing.

Heritage listing 
Wingello is an excellent example of a small country location with both platforms and buildings intact with timber buildings and a good collection of miscellaneous supporting structures. It is a rare example where both buildings survive and is typical of many similar arrangements which have now been removed. It is on a section of line where a number of early buildings survive to demonstrate early construction techniques and styles of building. The 1871 building is one of the earliest surviving buildings on that section of line.

Wingello railway station was listed on the New South Wales State Heritage Register on 2 April 1999.

References

Attribution

External links

Wingello station details Transport for New South Wales

Railway stations in Australia opened in 1871
Regional railway stations in New South Wales
New South Wales State Heritage Register
Articles incorporating text from the New South Wales State Heritage Register
Wingecarribee Shire
Main Southern railway line, New South Wales